Charlie Krank is a game designer who has worked primarily on role-playing games.

Early life
Charlie Krank was born in 1957 in San Francisco.

Career
Charlie Krank, an employee of the San Francisco game store Gambit, started volunteering to help Chaosium playtest in 1978 and became a paid employee two years later. Krank designed the collectible card game Mythos, which won the 1996 Best Card Game award at Origins. When Greg Stafford founded Issaries, Inc. and left Chaosium after 25 years, long-time employee and part owner Krank stepped up as the new president of Chaosium. Chaosium almost went out of business in 2003, and for a time afterward it was run out of president Krank's house with no paid staff.

On September 11, 2008, Krank informed the public that his friend and fellow long-time Chaosium employee Lynn Willis had been diagnosed with Parkinson's disease. Krank later reported that Willis died on January 18, 2013.

In a forum posting of 3 June 2015, Sandy Petersen announced that Krank was no longer President of Chaosium.

References

External links
 

1957 births
Businesspeople from the San Francisco Bay Area
Chaosium game designers
Living people
People from San Francisco
Role-playing game designers